Yael Globerman (born 1954) is an Israeli poet, writer, translator, book editor, and educator in literature.

Biography
She was born in Tel Aviv to emigrants from Poland to Israel after the Holocaust. She graduated from the Herzliya Hebrew Gymnasium, she enlisted in the Nahal. During that time she began publishing poems and stories in periodicals. Since the 1980s she lived for about 10 years in the United States with actor Jack Adelist and they had two children. They divorced and in 1992 she returned to Israel.

Books

1996 Shaking the Tree, novel
2000:  Alibi, poetry
2007  Same River Twice, poetry
2018  Map of the Peninsula, poetry

Awards

2000: ACUM Prize for her debut poetry book Alibi
2002 Mifal HaPayis Prize
2018: ACUM Prize for  Map of the Peninsula
2020: Prime Minister's Prize for Hebrew Literary Works

References

1954 births
Living people
Israeli poets
Israeli writers
Israeli translators